John P. Anton (November 2, 1920 – December 10, 2014) was Distinguished Professor Emeritus of Greek Philosophy and Culture at the University of South Florida. He was Corresponding Member of the Academy of Athens, Honorary Member of the Parnassos Literary Society, Honorary Member Phi Beta Kappa and a member of the Florida Philosophical Association. He featured in the Who is Who in the World, the Dictionary of International Biography, the Directory of American Scholars. He received four Honorary Doctorates from: the University of Athens, the University of Patras, the University of Ioannina and the Aristotle University of Thessaloniki. His areas of specialization were classical Greek philosophy, History of Philosophy, American Philosophy, Philosophy of Art, and Metaphysics.
He studied at Columbia University and earned his B.S, M.A. and Ph.D. in Philosophy. In 1973 he was one of the signers of the Humanist Manifesto II.

Anton authored ten books and edited eighteen books, among them Essays in Ancient Greek Philosophy (with A. Preus, five volumes, SUNY Press). He was the editor of the autobiographical work titled Upward Panic by Eva Palmer-Sikelianos. Professor Anton was the Editor of the Twayne Series in the late 1980s and early edited Constantine Santas' Aristotelis Valaoritis in 1976, which was translated into Greek in 2012 by Fagottoe Books. He has published more than 125 articles in various journals, and presented over 250 papers and addresses at various national and international conferences.

Selected writings
American Naturalism and Greek Philosophy, Humanity Books: Amherst, New York, 2005.
Categories and Experience: Essays on Aristotelian Themes, Dowling College Press, 1996.
The Poetry and Poetics of Constantine P. Cavafy: Aesthetic Visions of Sensual Reality, Chur, Switzerland: Harwood Academic Publishers, 1995.
Aristotle's Theory of Contrariety, University Press of America, 1957.

References

External links
John Anton's Academia.edu profile
USF profile

1920 births
20th-century American philosophers
21st-century American philosophers
American historians of philosophy
Philosophers from Florida
Columbia College (New York) alumni
2014 deaths
Metaphysicians
Philosophers of art
American scholars of ancient Greek philosophy
University of South Florida alumni
University of South Florida faculty